Destroyer Squadron 28 (DESRON 28), is a squadron of warships of the United States Navy. It is an operational component of Carrier Strike Group Eight. The squadron was formed in 1951. DESRON 28 was re-established on 1 September 1995, during the most recent reorganization of the Atlantic Fleet surface force. The mission of DESRON 28 is to provide a fully trained, combat ready force of surface combatants.

Destroyer Squadron 28 is a squadron of Arleigh Burke-class destroyers.  it was composed of the following ships:

References

External links
 Official DESRON 28 website

Destroyer squadrons of the United States Navy
Military units and formations established in 1951
1951 establishments in the United States